Zavin District is a district (bakhsh) in Kalat County, Razavi Khorasan Province, Iran. At the 2006 census, its population was 16,632, in 3,859 families.  The district has one city: Shahr-e Zow.  The district has two rural districts (dehestan): Pasakuh Rural District and Zavin Rural District.

References 

Districts of Razavi Khorasan Province
Kalat County